The Reinas de Belleza del Paraguay pageant was held at the Gran Nobile Hotel on September 2, 2017, to select Paraguayan representatives to four major beauty pageants: Miss Universe, Miss World, Miss International and Miss Earth. It was broadcast live on Brazilian channel TV UP.

For the first time in its history, the pageant was held in Ciudad del Este, 320 km from the Paraguayan capital. There were two groups of candidates: Miss Universe/International candidates, and Miss World/Earth candidates.

Results
Miss Universe/Miss International group

Miss World/Miss Earth group

Special awards

Contestants

Miss Universe/Miss International group
There are 13 official contestants.

See also
Miss Paraguay
Miss Universe 2017
Miss World 2017
Miss International 2017
Miss Earth 2017

External links
Promociones Gloria, holder of the franchises.
Reinas de Belleza del Paraguay Facebook Page

References

2017 beauty pageants
2017 in Paraguay
2017
September 2017 events in South America